In the 1865 Iowa State Senate elections, Iowa voters elected state senators to serve in the eleventh Iowa General Assembly. Following the expansion of the Iowa Senate from 46 to 48 seats in 1865, elections were held for 23 of the state senate's 48 seats. State senators serve four-year terms in the Iowa State Senate.

The general election took place in 1865.

Following the previous election in 1863, Republicans had control of the Iowa Senate with 41 seats to Democrats' five seats.

To claim control of the chamber from Republicans, the Democrats needed to net 20 Senate seats.

Republicans maintained control of the Iowa State Senate following the election with the balance of power shifting to Republicans holding 42 seats and Democrats having six seats (a net gain of 1 seat each for Republicans and Democrats).

Summary of Results 
 Note: The holdover Senators not up for re-election are not listed on this table.

Source:

Detailed Results
NOTE: The Iowa General Assembly does not provide detailed vote totals for Iowa State Senate elections in 1865.

See also
 Elections in Iowa

External links
District boundaries were redrawn before the 1865 general election for the Iowa Senate:
Iowa Senate Districts 1864-1865 map
Iowa Senate Districts 1866-1867 map

References

Iowa Senate
Iowa
Iowa Senate elections